Anna Page Scott (1863-1925) was an American Impressionist painter and educator.

Biography
Scott was born in Dubuque, Iowa on  October 13, 1863. She studied at the School of the Art Institute of Chicago, the Pennsylvania Academy of the Fine Arts, and the Académie Colarossi. Around 1890 Scott settled in New York City where she worked as an illustrator for the Century Publishing Company. In 1897 she moved to Rochester, New York where she began her teaching career at the Mechanics Institute. She taught there until 1913.

Scott died on October 13, 1925 in Dubuque.

Legacy
Scott was included in the 2016 traveling exhibition Rebels With a Cause: American Impressionist Women.

References

External links

  
1863 births
1925 deaths
19th-century American women artists
20th-century American women artists
People from Dubuque, Iowa 
School of the Art Institute of Chicago alumni
Pennsylvania Academy of the Fine Arts alumni
Académie Colarossi alumni